Henderson Dottin (born 4 January 1980) is a Barbadian athlete specialising in the high jump. He won several medals at regional level.

He has personal bests of 2.25 metres outdoors (2008) and 2.23 metres indoors (2003). Both are current national records.

Competition record

References

1980 births
Living people
Male high jumpers
Barbadian high jumpers
Athletes (track and field) at the 2003 Pan American Games
Athletes (track and field) at the 2007 Pan American Games
Athletes (track and field) at the 2002 Commonwealth Games
Barbadian male athletes
Competitors at the 2003 Summer Universiade
Commonwealth Games competitors for Barbados
Pan American Games competitors for Barbados